Sir Thomas Woodcock  Hon FRHSC (born 20 May 1951) is the senior herald and genealogist at the College of Arms in London.  He is a former Garter Principal King of Arms and a former member of the Royal Household.

Early life  
Woodcock was educated at Eton College before going up to University College, Durham, where he graduated with a Bachelor of Arts degree. He then pursued further studies at Darwin College, Cambridge, becoming LLB.  He was called to the Bar at the Inner Temple.

Career
Woodcock began his heraldic career in 1975 as a research assistant to Sir Anthony Wagner, Garter King of Arms. In 1978 he was appointed Rouge Croix Pursuivant. In 1982 he was promoted to Somerset Herald, becoming Norroy and Ulster in 1997, then Garter Principal King of Arms on 1 April 2010. On 1 July 2021, Woodcock retired as Garter as well as his other heraldic and genealogical offices.

Personal life
In 1998, Woodcock married Lucinda Harmsworth King.

Honours
Woodcock was appointed Lieutenant of the Royal Victorian Order (LVO) in the 1996 Birthday Honours, promoted Commander of the Royal Victorian Order (CVO) in the 2011 Birthday Honours and Knight Commander of the Royal Victorian Order (KCVO) in the 2021 Birthday Honours.

In 2017, he succeeded William Hunt, Windsor Herald, as Genealogist of the Most Venerable Order of the Hospital of Saint John of Jerusalem serving until 2021, having been appointed in July 2018 an Officer of the Order (OStJ).

A Deputy Lieutenant for the County of Lancashire since December 2005, he assists the Lord Lieutenant, Lord Shuttleworth, to represent King Charles III throughout the county.

Elected a Fellow of the Society of Antiquaries of London (FSA) on 3 March 1990, he was awarded the SAL's Society Medal in 2015. He was also elected a Fellow of The Heraldry Society (FHS) on 26 June 1996.

Arms

See also
Heraldry
College of Arms
King of Arms
Herald
Pursuivant

References

External links
Thomas Woodcock's Coat of Arms – Granted in 1961
CUHAGS Officer of Arms Index
Debrett's People of Today

1951 births
Living people
People educated at Eton College
Alumni of University College, Durham
Alumni of Darwin College, Cambridge
British genealogists
English officers of arms
Members of the Inner Temple
Deputy Lieutenants of Lancashire
Fellows of the Society of Antiquaries of London
Garter Principal Kings of Arms
Officers of the Order of St John
Knights Commander of the Royal Victorian Order